Peter Goggin (born 30 October 1965) is an Australian cricketer. He played in twenty-one first-class and seven List A matches for Queensland between 1990 and 1993.

See also
 List of Queensland first-class cricketers

References

External links
 

1965 births
Living people
Australian cricketers
Queensland cricketers
People from Roma, Queensland
Cricketers from Queensland